The 2010 season is St. Patricks Athletic F.C.'s 81st year in existence, and their 59th year in the top division. The previous season the Saints finished 7th, failing to qualify for any European Competition.

Pre-season
When the 2009 season finished, St Pats underwent a revamp. Most of the squad from the 2009 season was let go, only 5 players from 2009 were kept for 2010.

On 9 December Pete Mahon was appointed manager after successfully leading the Saints out of relegation trouble last season. Pete Mahon signed 13 players during pre-season, creating a good deal of excitement amongst the fans.

The team spent a weekend in Wexford where they defeated Wexford Youths 3–0.  Up next were 2 home friendlies against Longford Town F.C., 3–1 and Limerick F.C., 1–1. These were followed by 2 away matches against Waterford United F.C., 0–0 and Bray Wanderers F.C., 1–3.

Team kit
On 15 January it was announced that St Pats secured a kit deal with Umbro to add 4 years onto the deal already in place. Nissan were announced as the new main sponsors of the club after the deal with Paddy Power ran out. A new home and away jersey were issued for the 2010 season.

First-team squad

Premier Division

Matches

Final Table

Cups

FAI Cup
Third Round

Fourth Round

Quarter-final

Semi-final

Semi-final replay

League of Ireland Cup
Second Round

Quarter Final

Setanta Cup
Group Stage

Semi-final First Leg

Semi-final Second Leg

Final

Leinster Senior Cup
First Round

References

St Patrick's Athletic
2010